The Democratic Movement for Change (Tnu'a Demokratit LeShinui), commonly known by its Hebrew acronym Dash, was a short-lived and initially highly successful centrist political party in Israel. Formed in 1976 by numerous well-known non-politicians, following a breakup it ceased to exist in less than two years.

Background
Dash was formed on 2 November 1976 by the merger of several liberal movements (including Shinui), together with numerous public figures, including Yigael Yadin, Amnon Rubinstein, Shmuel Tamir, Meir Amit, Meir Zorea and several other business leaders and academics, as well as some Israeli Arabs.

The party's formation was the result of a growing dissatisfaction with the mainstream parties, particularly the ruling Alignment, which, including its predecessors, had ruled Israel since independence in 1948. Starting with the Yom Kippur War, the Alignment had been hit with numerous scandals during the mid-1970s, including:
The suicide of Housing Minister, Avraham Ofer, after a police investigation began into allegations he used party funds illegally.
Asher Yadlin, the governor-designate of the Bank of Israel was found guilty of accepting bribes and sentenced to five years in prison (the Yadlin affair).
Leah Rabin, wife of Prime Minister Yitzhak Rabin was found to have an overseas bank account, illegal in Israel at the time (the Dollar Account affair).

Initially the party was called Democrats–Shinui (Democratim–Shinui), but was soon changed to the Democratic Movement for Change and, as with many parties in Israel, became popularly known by its acronym, Dash. The new party caught the public's imagination, with over 37,000 people signing up as members within a few weeks of its foundation. It also pioneered the use of primaries to choose its electoral list, something that was intended to show its democratic credentials and prevent cronyism. Previously in Israel, party lists had been decided upon by the parties' committees, but since the late 1970s, almost every party in Israel (with the exception of the Haredi ones, Shas and United Torah Judaism) has followed Dash's lead and adopted the primaries system.

Dash did surprisingly well in its first electoral test, picking up 15 of the 120 seats in the Knesset, the best performance by a third party since the 1961 elections. This made it the third largest party after Menachem Begin's Likud and the Alignment, which had shrunk from 51 to 32 seats. However, Begin was still able to form a narrow 61-seat right-wing coalition with Shlomtzion (Ariel Sharon's party), the National Religious Party and Agudat Israel.

Much of Dash's success came at the expense of the Labor Party, with which it competed for the votes of mainly Ashkenazi higher-income and better-educated citizens. This had the effect of guaranteeing Likud's first victory.

The party was invited into the coalition in November 1977, five months after the Knesset term had started. The party picked up several ministerial portfolios - Meir Amit was made Minister of Transportation and Minister of Communications, Shmuel Tamir became Minister of Justice and Yadin was named as Deputy Prime Minister.

However, the fact that the party did not control the balance of power led to internal disagreements over its role. The party began to disintegrate, finally splitting in three on 14 September 1978, with seven MKs breaking away to reform Shinui, another seven founding the Democratic Movement and Assaf Yaguri creating Ya'ad. Shinui (including Amit) and Ya'ad left the coalition, whilst the Democratic Movement, which included Tamir and Yadin, remained in the government.

Nonetheless, even the new parties were not stable, with the Democratic Movement also crumbling. In 1980, three of its seven members left to found Ahva and Mordechai Elgrably quit the party to sit as an independent (he later joined Equality in Israel – Panthers to create the Unity Party). Four months before the 1981 elections the party folded, with Tamir, Yadin, and Binyamin Halevi sitting as independents for the rest of the Knesset term. Tamir lost his ministerial position in 1980, though Yadin remained Deputy PM. Ahva also followed the breakup pattern, losing two of its three MKs before the Knesset term ended.

Further changes occurred when two Shinui MKs defected to the Alignment and two of the three Ahva MKs left the party.

Aftermath
The only long-lasting faction of the collapse was Shinui, which won seats in the 1981 elections, the only party emerging from Dash to do so. It merged with Mapam and Ratz to form Meretz in 1992, before breaking away again under Avraham Poraz in the mid-1990s during the 14th Knesset.

Shinui met a similar fate to its predecessor. In the 2003 elections it won 15 seats, making it the third-largest party after Likud and Labour. The party joined Ariel Sharon's coalition, but left in late 2005 after disagreements over the budget. Before the 2006 elections it split into three after most of its MKs were defeated in internal party elections, and none of them won a seat in the elections. Shinui was subsequently succeeded as the main centrist party by Kadima and later Yesh Atid, led by Tommy Lapid's son Yair.

Leaders

Election results

Knesset members

References

External links
Democratic Movement for Change (DMC) Knesset website

Defunct political parties in Israel
Defunct liberal political parties
Liberal parties in Israel
Centrist parties in Israel
Political parties established in 1976
Political parties disestablished in 1978
1976 establishments in Israel
1978 disestablishments in Israel